Bala Nagamma is a 1966 Indian Kannada-language film, directed by P. R. Kaundinya and produced by Vikram Srinivas. The film stars Rajkumar, Udaykumar, Narasimharaju and Master Babu. The film has musical score by S. Rajeshwara Rao. The movie is based on one of the popular stories of the traditional folklore Burra katha.

Cast 

Rajkumar
Udaykumar
Narasimharaju
Master Babu
Rajasree
Kalpana as Manikya Devi
Sharada
Sabitha
Suryakala
Janaki
Baby Vishalakshi
Balakrishna in Guest Appearance
Pandari Bai in Guest Appearance
R. T. Rama in Guest Appearance
V. Nagayya in Guest Appearance
Chi Sadashivaiah in Guest Appearance

Production 
Produced by Sanathana Kalamandira, the filming took place in Vikram Studios, Madras (now Chennai). Rajasree was signed to play the title role opposite Rajkumar. The Indian Express reported on 3 October 1965 that recording of three tracks for the film were complete, and that the producer Vikram Srinivasan confirmed completing filming by November.

Soundtrack 
The music was composed by Nageshwara Rao.

References

External links 
 
 

1966 films
1960s Kannada-language films